Tin Wan is one of the 17 constituencies in the Southern District, Hong Kong. The constituency returns one district councillor to the Southern District Council, with an election every four years.

Tin Wan constituency is loosely based on Tin Wan Estate and Hung Fuk Court in Aberdeen with estimated population of 16,716.

Councillors represented

Election results

2010s

2000s

1990s

Notes

References

Ap Lei Chau
Constituencies of Hong Kong
Constituencies of Southern District Council
1991 establishments in Hong Kong
Constituencies established in 1991